Roobarb (also known as Roobarb and Custard) is a British animated children's television series, created by Grange Calveley and originally shown on BBC1 just before the evening news. Each cartoon, written by Calveley and directed by Bob Godfrey, was about five minutes long. Thirty episodes were made, and the show was first shown on 21 October 1974. The theme is that of the friendly rivalry between Roobarb, a green dog with an overactive imagination, and Custard, the mischievous laconic pink cat from next door.

The narration of the series was provided by the actor Richard Briers. On 17 February 2013, Briers died, followed four days later by animator Godfrey.

Original series
Roobarb is a green dog, and Custard is a pink cat. Roobarb is always involved in some kind of misadventure which he approaches with unbounded enthusiasm. Custard is cynical and sets out to sabotage Roobarb's fun. Which one comes out on top varies from episode to episode. Other characters in the series are the birds, who watch the antics of the other two from the safety of a nearby tree, often making snide remarks, and siding with whoever is winning. There is also a rather timid, pink mouse as well as the Sun and the Moon, who are depicted as sentient and able to talk to the other characters.

The series is animated in a deliberately rough style, using marker pens and a very sketchy drawing technique, so that the pictures are constantly "shaking". This effect, known to animators as "boiling", gives an energetic character to the show, and was a contrast to the slick, smooth colouring of the American Hanna-Barbera shows that were being shown on British television. The series was voiced by actor Richard Briers and the theme tune was written by Johnny Hawksworth for de Wolfe Music. It was the first fully animated television series to be made in the United Kingdom. The series was later shown in reruns on the American children's television series Eureeka's Castle on Nickelodeon, with an American dub.

The series was a success, greatly loved by children and adults alike, and winning numerous awards. The series was also known for its eccentric use of quirky word play and sight gags.

Characters

Roobarb
A green dog with a shaggy tail, two hairs each on the side of his head and a wild animation. He's fond of bones, adventure, inventing and also seems to eat various things like coal, paper, books, chairs, shoes, holes in carpets, trees. Roobarb is usually very good hearted and seems friendly to everyone he meets. He loves performing shows and is often helpful.

His rival is Custard, his next door neighbour and sometimes best friend. Roobarb lives in a small cosy house, sleeps in a basket and seems to get on well with his rent free life. He's not always very bright and always curious. Although anthropomorphic, Roobarb does usually run and walk on all fours, barks like a dog and even has his own dog bowl for water. Roobarb is always deep in thoughts, usually for long hours until a plan has been thought. Roobarb thinks he's brave and handsome.

Custard
A chubby pink cat and Roobarb's cousin, friendly rival and sometimes best friend. Custard usually likes to sabotage Roobarb's fun and plays pranks on him and often looks for the biggest laugh of the day. Although malicious, Custard has been shown to care about Roobarb and has even helped him out a few times and enjoys his company. Examples include when he dressed up as Santa Claus for Roobarb's Christmas party to help save the day in case anything went wrong. Another example is when he helped Roobarb spook a group of tramps who retired to bed in Roobarb's house.

Custard lives behind a large white wooden fence where he also takes his naps on top of it. Being a cat, Custard has a fondness for fishing, always trying to find his way to catch the fish, most of the time failing, he also envies Roobarb in competitions.

2005 series
A new series titled Roobarb and Custard Too debuted on Channel 5 on 8 August 2005. Like the original series, it was written by Grange Calveley and narrated by Richard Briers. The series introduced a large number of other animal characters who also got involved in Roobarb's schemes. It was produced by Adam Sharp and Bernadette O'Riordan for A&B TV, and directed by Jason Tammemagi; the animation was by the Irish company Monster Animation & Design. The revival used computer animation, but kept the "wobbly" look and plain white backgrounds from the original series. The music for the revival was by Jon Atkinson. There were 39 episodes.

Episode list

Roobarb
"When Roobarb Made a Spike"
"When Roobarb Didn't See the Sun Come Up"
"When Roobarb Was Being Bored Then Not Being Bored"
"When the Tree Fell to Pieces"
"When Roobarb Found Sauce" – Roobarb sets out to find the source of the pond.
"When It Was Night" – Roobarb dreams that he and Custard are 19th Century US Cavalry officers fighting a band of "Crow Indians".
"When It Was Christmas" – Roobarb plans a delicious Christmas feast and everyone is invited, but when the dog takes it too far and eats the whole feast, he is ashamed, until a special guest arrives and saves the day, yet Roobarb feels terrible for poor Custard not turning up, who is going to save the Christmas party now?
"When The Sun Was Just Right" – Roobarb becomes a film director.
"When The Opera Wasn't A Phantom" – Roobarb builds a science laboratory in his cellar and tests out a new potion.
"When There Wasn't Treasure" – Roobarb dresses as a pirate and searches for treasure.
"When It Wasn't Thorsday" – Roobarb angers the Viking Gods.
"When Roobarb Was Cheating"
"When Custard Was Sorry"
"When Roobarb Mixed the Paint" – Roobarb decides to redecorate the house, and tempts the others to help him out.
"When Roobarb's Heart Ruled His Head" – Roobarb takes pity on a pack of stray dogs, only to wind up out of house and home himself. 
"When You're Going To Fly-Fly High"
"When The Day Didn't Arrive"
"When Roobarb Did The Lion's Share"
"When Roobarb Was at the End of His Tether (and so was Custard)" - Roobarb joins the Scouts and Custard annoys him by insisting he obeys all the rules to the letter.
"When Custard Stole the Show" – Custard wonders how deep the pond is and decides to find out, building his own diving outfit and adopting the persona Jaques Coostard. Roobarb forms a plan to get the fish out.
"When There Was A Dance at Foxes Dale" - Roobarb and Poodle Princess enter a dancing competition, but Custard tries to scupper their chances.
"When Roobarb Wasn't As Pleased As Punch" – Roobarb performs a puppet show, but nobody (except Roobarb himself) finds it funny.
"When Roobarb Turned Over A New Leaf" – Roobarb plants his garden and wakes up to find that a "big fat dreamy jungle" had formed.
"When There Was Someone Else" – Roobarb makes friends with a shadowy boxer and challenges everybody to have a boxing fight with him.
"When The Day Wouldn't Keep Still" – Roobarb gets hiccups and thinks it is an earthquake.
"When Roobarb Got A Long Break" – To get revenge on his noisy neighbours Roobarb makes a noisy contraption only to get attention from the police.
"When The Pipes Call The Tune" – A parcel arrives at Roobarb's doorstep, he's extremely excited, however, a surprise parcel arrives for Custard and he's delighted to know that it was because anybody who orders a set of bagpipes from Glasgow, also receives a package for their next door neighbour.
"When A Knight Lost His Day" – Roobarb finds an old book which happens to be of his family tree, he decides to become a knight.
"When Custard Got Too Near The Bone" – Roobarb plants bones round the turf for his garden party, Custard hears this and plans to sell the land for a lot of money to a gang of fierce dogs, but are the bones what the dogs expected?
"When There Was A Big Mix Up" – Roobarb becomes a hypnotist and everything goes wrong.

Roobarb and Custard Too
"When There Was A Surprise" – Roobarb builds a new computer to help him with his inventions.
"When Custard Was Grounded" – Roobarb organises a model plane air show for the garden and Custard nearly wins the prize trophy.
"When Custard Wrote A Book" – Custard and Poodle Princess try to get Roobarb to relax on a nothing day.
"When There Was An Elephant" – A travelling elephant, with a case of the sneezes, arrives in the garden on a very hot day.
"When Custard Was Very, Very Naughty" – Moggy Malone & Poodle Princess goes away and leaves Roobarb and Custard to fend for themselves.
"When The Books Went Bye Bye" – Roobarb throws all his books out and challenges custard to a test of knowledge.
"When There Was A Wind-Up" – Custard mocks Roobarb as he starts a new clockwork invention.
"When Roobarb Found The Hieroglypics" – Roobarb tries to find treasure after he discovered ancient Egyptian architectures underground.
"When It Ended in Tears" – Roobarb experiments with a new invention for laughter.
"When There Was A Big Band" – A famous musician arrives in the garden and Roobarb decides to put on a show.
"When The Garden Was Dry" – Roobarb decides to irrigate the garden during a hot summer's day.
"When There Was A Time Warp" – Roobarb persuades Custard to try some time travel.
"When It Was Cool To Be Smooth" – Roobarb decides to get rid of the bumps in the garden and invents some trousers that help him hover.
"When There Was A Pottery Party" – A new tea set is made for a garden party.
"When The Computer Went on the Blink" – Mouse tries to help Roobarb with his computer and Virtually Impossible Helmet.
"When There Was An Opera" – Roobarb writes a new opera to be performed by Moggy Malone.
"When The Mouse Arrived For Christmas" – A festive moment as the garden puts on a pantomime called 'The Prince and the Snow Witch'.
"When Roobarb Went on a Fitness Drive" – Custard persuades Roobarb to lose the fat and get fit.
"When Modern Thingumajigs Need Tweaking" – Custard becomes an entertainment svengali and signs up Moggy Malone and Poodle Princess.
"When The Wind Blows, The Space Age Will Stop" – Roobarb dreams up a way to travel at high speed across the Space. Custard becomes his test pilot.
"When There Wasn't A Boiled Egg" – Roobarb has an idea for some new fast food for his friends.
"When Rookie Fell Out of the Sky" – Roobarb develops some silly wings in an attempt to help his old friend Rookie fly again.
"When The Laughing Had To Stop" – Roobarb sets up an artist's studio and paints a masterpiece portrait of Custard.
"When Roobarb Was Bowled Over" – Roobarb wants to make bowls more exciting.
"When Walter's Web Caught Roobarb's Eye" – Mouse helps Roobarb build a web of information.
"When There Was A Dance Festival" – Roobarb builds a dance floor and hosts a grand competition with a prize.
"When There Was Magic" – Post Dog delivers some magic in the form of an old wizard for Roobarb and Mouse.
"When The Ballet Hit The Skids" – Roobarb's Garden Ballet Company puts on its own version of 'Duck pond on Ice'.
"When The Dinosaur Broke Loose" – Roobarb investigates the birds' ancestors and starts looking for fossils.
"When Jeremy Barker Turned Up" – On a day with no news, Roobarb decides to become a media baron.
"When There Was A Country Fayre" – Poodle Princess recites some poetry, which prompts Roobarb to put on a medieval fayre.
"When The Molecules Got Loose" – Roobarb and mouse come up with a very high tech plan to get Custard moving.
"When There Was A Duel" – Roobarb and Custurd can't agree on anything so Rookie arranges a duel at dawn for them.
"When It Was A Wibbling Week" – Roobarb devises a brand new sport that is good for players and spectators.
"When The Astrognomes Landed" – Roobarb is woken up early one morning to find that gnomes have invaded the garden.
"When Everything Went Lumpy" – Roobarb tries to find some bread for breakfast.
"When Communications Weren't The Best" – Roobarb builds and launches the most amazing satellite.
"When There Really Was A Something" – Everyone gets excited about a new film as Roobarb, Custard and Mouse search The Space.
"When There Was A Cuckoo" – An unemployment Cuckoo arrives in the garden and Roobarb attempts to get him back in time.

UK VHS/DVD Releases
Between 1988 and 1990, Channel 5 released two videos of the 1974 series with ten episodes on each one and the first video wasre-released by Entertainment UK Ltd and PolyGram Video (Cat. No. EUKV 2006) on 1991 until it had a new re-release by 4 Front Video(Cat. No. 6356043) on 24 April 1995 until it was reissued by PolyGram Filmed Entertainment (UK) Ltd (Cat. No. 0463463) on 16 June 1997.

In 1993, 4 Front Video released a single video containing twenty episodes of the 1974 series consisting of ten episodes from each of the two Channel 5 releases together on one video.

In 2000, Contender Entertainment Group Ltd released a single video with the first eight episodes of the 1974 series on it.

In popular culture
The Noah and Nelly in... SkylArk episode "During a Picnic" features a pirate ship called The Nutty Dog, the figurehead of which looks exactly like Roobarb.

The Streets' song "Turn the Page" mentions "Roobarb and Custard verses".

A sampling of Roobarb episodes and theme song made up the basis for the 1992 single of the same name by the UK group Shaft.

The end bit of the theme tune could be heard at the end of each of 3 adverts for Ambrosia flavored custard.

Roobarb and Custard were featured in the 'Official BBC Children in Need Medley' video by Peter Kay which contained many other popular cartoon characters. They appeared via a televised monitor as they were 2-D animation, as opposed to the Stop-Motion style of the video and characters.

Roobarb and Custard became the stars of a series of children's books based on the TV series by Mogzilla Publishing in 2009.

The Roobarb theme tune appears in the Channel 4 comedy "Spaced" (Season one, Episode 4: "Battles") in a flashback as Tim is chased by a pack of dogs, and also as Daisy chases the pack itself.

Roobarb and Custard were used as mascots for the PDSA charity in the UK.

Broadcast history
USA
Nickelodeon (1988)
UK
BBC1 (1974)
The Children's Channel (1992)
Nickelodeon (UK and Ireland) (1993)
Boomerang (2005-2008)
Australia
ABC (1977-1993)

References

External links
Roobarb & Custard's official web site
Roobarb & Custard's producers and brand guardians
Roobarb at bbc.co.uk
 
Roobarb eBooks by Box of Frogs

1974 British television series debuts
1970s British animated television series
1970s British children's television series
1974 British television series endings
2005 British television series debuts
2005 British television series endings
2000s British animated television series
2000s British children's television series
British children's animated comedy television series
English-language television shows
BBC children's television shows
Australian Broadcasting Corporation original programming
Channel 5 (British TV channel) original programming
British television series revived after cancellation
Animated television series about dogs